Madonna and Child Blessing is a 79 cm by 63 cm tempera on panel painting by Giovanni Bellini. It dates to 1460–1464 and originally hung in the offices of the Magistrato del Monte Nuovissimo at Palazzo dei Camerlinghi in Venice, whereas it is now part of the collection of the same city's Gallerie dell'Accademia

References

1464 paintings
Venice
Paintings in the Gallerie dell'Accademia